Agalychnis danieli, also known as the Antioquia leaf frog, is a species of frog in the subfamily Phyllomedusinae. It is endemic to Colombia and only known from its type locality in the northern part of the western flank of the Cordillera Occidental in the Antioquia Department. The specific name danieli honours Brother Daniel Gonzales Patiño, a Colombian monk with naturalist inclinations who became the director of Natural History Museum of the Instituto de La Salle, Bogotá. 

Later survey to the type locality did not reveal new specimens. The habitat of this species is threatened by clearing of the forest for fruit and cacao cultivation. It might occur in the adjacent Las Orquídeas National Natural Park and Mesenia-Paramillo Nature Reserve.

References

danieli
Amphibians of the Andes
Amphibians of Colombia
Endemic fauna of Colombia
Amphibians described in 1988
Taxa named by José Vicente Rueda Almonacid
Taxonomy articles created by Polbot
Fauna of the northwestern Andean montane forests